Yang Chiung-ying (born 19 October 1964) is a Taiwanese politician. She was first elected to the Legislative Yuan in 1998, and served until 2016, when she was defeated by Hung Tzu-yung. Yang then served as deputy mayor of Taichung within the municipal administration of Lu Shiow-yen. She was re-elected to the Legislative Yuan in 2020.

References

1964 births
Living people
Kuomintang Members of the Legislative Yuan in Taiwan
Members of the 4th Legislative Yuan
Members of the 5th Legislative Yuan
Members of the 6th Legislative Yuan
Members of the 7th Legislative Yuan
Members of the 8th Legislative Yuan
Taichung Members of the Legislative Yuan
Tunghai University alumni
21st-century Taiwanese women politicians
Deputy mayors of Taichung
Members of the 10th Legislative Yuan
20th-century Taiwanese women politicians